John Carlsen (born 31 December 1961) is a Danish former racing cyclist. He rode in six Grand Tours between 1988 and 1991. He won Stage 8 of the 1989 Giro d'Italia which was a high mountain stage including a climb of the Gran Sasso d'Italia. He also competed in the team time trial event at the 1984 Summer Olympics.

Career achievements

Major results
1982
 1st Stage 4 Tour of Sweden
1986
 2nd National Road Race Championships
1988
 5th Grand Prix d'Isbergues
 8th Overall Volta a Portugal
1st Stage 1
1989
 1st Stage 8 Giro d'Italia
 7th Overall Tour du Limousin
1990
 9th Overall Vuelta a Andalucía
 9th Overall Route du Sud
1991
 9th Druivenkoers Overijse

Grand Tour general classification results timeline

References

External links
 

1961 births
Living people
Danish male cyclists
Danish Giro d'Italia stage winners
Olympic cyclists of Denmark
Cyclists at the 1984 Summer Olympics
Sportspeople from the Capital Region of Denmark